Wang Haoran (born 19 January 2001) is a Chinese footballer currently playing as a midfielder for Henan Songshan Longmen.

Club career
Wang was born in Luoyang, and was selected as one of thirty children to join the Atlético Madrid academy, as part of a Wanda Group initiative to encourage young Chinese footballers to play in Spain. After three years in Spain he returned to his hometown club of Henan Songshan Longmen where he initially joined their youth team before being promoted to their senior team in the 2021 Chinese Super League season. He would make his senior debut in a league game on 15 September 2021 in a 1-1 draw against Guangzhou.

Career statistics
.

References

External links

2001 births
Living people
Sportspeople from Luoyang
Chinese footballers
Chinese expatriate footballers
Association football midfielders
Chinese Super League players
Atlético Madrid footballers
Henan Songshan Longmen F.C. players
Chinese expatriate sportspeople in Spain
Expatriate footballers in Spain